The 2018–19 Texas A&M Aggies men's basketball team represented Texas A&M University in the 2018–19 NCAA Division I men's basketball season. The team's head coach Billy Kennedy was in his eighth and final season at Texas A&M. The Aggies played their home games at Reed Arena in College Station, Texas in their seventh season as members of the Southeastern Conference. They finished the season 14–18, 6–12 in SEC play to finish in 11th place. They defeated Vanderbilt in the first round of the SEC tournament before losing to Mississippi State.

On March 15, 2019, the school fired head coach Billy Kennedy after eight seasons. On April 3, the school hired Virginia Tech head coach Buzz Williams as the team's next head coach.

Previous season
The Aggies finished the 2017–18 season 22–13, 9–9 in SEC play to finish in a tie for seventh place. They lost in the second round of the SEC tournament to Alabama. They received an at-large bid to the NCAA tournament where they defeated Providence and North Carolina to advance to the Sweet Sixteen where they lost to Michigan.

Offseason

Departures

Incoming transfers

2018 recruiting class
There were no recruiting class of 2018 for Texas A&M.

Roster

Source

Schedule and results

|-
!colspan=12 style=|Regular season

|-
!colspan=12 style=|  SEC tournament

Source

References

Texas A&M Aggies men's basketball seasons
Texas AandM